Ryde, an electoral district of the Legislative Assembly in the Australian state of New South Wales, has had four incarnations since it was first established in 1894. It has returned one member for most of its existence, except for the period 1920 to 1927 when it returned five members.


Members

Election results

Elections in the 2010s

2019

2015

2011

Elections in the 2000s

2008 by-election

2007

2003

Elections in the 1990s

1999

1981 - 1999

Elections in the 1980s

1988

1984

1981

1968 - 1981

Elections in the 1960s

1965

1962

Elections in the 1950s

1959

1956

1953

1950

Elections in the 1940s

1947

1945 by-election

1944

1941

1940 by-election

Elections in the 1930s

1938

1935

1932

1930

Elections in the 1920s

1927

1925

1922

1920

Elections in the 1910s

1917

1913

1904 - 1913

Elections in the 1900s

1904 by-election

1901

Elections in the 1890s

1898

1895

1894

Notes

References

New South Wales state electoral results by district